Yūsuke Tanaka (born April 14, 1986) is a Japanese former footballer who played as a defender.

Career
On 11 January 2015, Tanaka signed with Australian A-League side Western Sydney Wanderers. He was released by the Wanderers on 6 June 2015.

Tanaka played for various Japanese J League teams, including Yokohama F. Marinos and Kawasaki Frontale.

J-League Firsts
 Appearance: November 26, 2006. Yokohama F Marinos 0 vs 1 Ōita Trinita, Nissan Stadium

Career statistics
Updated to 23 February 2018.

References

External links
Profile at Cerezo Osaka 

1986 births
Living people
Association football people from Tokyo
Japanese footballers
J1 League players
J2 League players
Yokohama F. Marinos players
Kawasaki Frontale players
Western Sydney Wanderers FC players
Cerezo Osaka players
Fagiano Okayama players
Association football defenders